Raja Vijayaraghavan Valsala (born 28 May 1967) is a judge of the Kerala High Court. The High Court of Kerala is the highest court in the Indian state of Kerala and in the Union Territory of Lakshadweep. The High Court of Kerala is headquartered at Ernakulam, Kochi.

Early life and career
Raja completed his schooling from Deva Mata Convent School, Kollam, Trinity Lyceum School, Kollam, St. Aloysius Higher Secondary School, Kollam and Fatima Mata National College, Kollam, graduated from Thangal Kunju Musaliar College of Engineering, Kollam and obtained a law degree from Kerala Law Academy Law College, Thiruvananthapuram. Raja enrolled as an Advocate in 1994 and started practice at Kollam later shifted his practice to High Court of Kerala. On 10 April 2015 he was appointed as additional judge of Kerala High Court and became permanent from 5 April 2017

References

External links
 High Court of Kerala

Living people
Judges of the Kerala High Court
21st-century Indian judges
1967 births
Indian judges